Ana Ramírez may refer to:

Ana Ramírez (volleyball) (born 1981), Spanish volleyball player
Ana Ramírez (rugby union) (born 1991), Colombian rugby sevens player